Etarlis is the second full-length studio album by the British progressive rock band Mermaid Kiss. It is a concept album that tells the story of a journey of two friends, Anna and Gerri, and their adventures in the fantasy land of Etarlis.

Track listing

 "Prelude" - 2:11
 "A Different Sky" - 5:18
 "Walking with Ghosts" - 4:00
 "Dark Cover" - 4:37
 "Nowhere to Hide" - 7:08
 "Siren Song" - 3:14
 "A Sea Change" - 7:20
 "The Lighthouse"
 "The Running Tide"
 "In Deep"
 "Slide and Sway"
 "In Deep" (Reprise)
 "Shadow Girl" - 4:04
 "Beat the Drum" - 6:35
 "Crayola Skies" - 5:36
 "The City of Clouds (Qway-Lin)" - 10:30

Line-up

Band members

Evelyn Downing - lead and harmony vocals, flute
Jamie Field - acoustic guitars, occasional electric guitar & backing vocals
Andrew Garman - keyboards, bass, drums, percussion
Nigel Hooton - lead and rhythm electric and acoustic guitars

Session musicians

Kate Belcher - lead & harmony vocals on ‘Nowhere To Hide’, ‘Siren Song’ and ‘Shadow Girl’.
Wendy Marks - cor anglais, oboe, recorders

Guests

Troy Donockley (Iona)
Jonathan Edwards (Panic Room & ex-Karnataka)

References

2007 albums
Concept albums